The women's road race competition of the cycling events at the 2015 Pan American Games was held on July 25 in the streets of Downtown Toronto and High Park with the start and finish being at Exhibition Place.

Schedule
All times are Eastern Daylight Time (UTC−4).

Results

References

Cycling at the 2015 Pan American Games
2015 in women's road cycling
Road cycling at the Pan American Games